George Sylvester Taylor (March 2, 1822 – January 3, 1910) became the first mayor of Chicopee, Massachusetts, on January 5, 1891.

Personal life
He was born March 2, 1822, in South Hadley, Massachusetts, one of ten children of Sylvester Taylor, a butcher (1793–1881) and Sarah Eaton (1793–1870). The family moved to Chicopee Falls in 1828, which was then a part of Springfield, Massachusetts.

He married  Asenath Boylston Cobb (1826–1898) on November 25, 1845, with whom he had six children. Taylor died in Chicopee.

Business and political life
Starting in 1864, Taylor ran the Belcher & Taylor Agricultural Tool Company in Springfield.

As a member of the Republican Party, Taylor served the Massachusetts House of Representatives from 1860 to 1861 and the Massachusetts Senate in 1869.  Prior to becoming Mayor, he was president of Chicopee Falls Savings Bank.

When Chicopee, Massachusetts, was first incorporated as a city in 1891, Taylor was elected mayor without opposition.

Taylor was a deacon of the Congregational Church of Chicopee for 45 years, and president of the local YMCA.

See also
 1869 Massachusetts legislature

References

Reference sources 
 Chicopee History

1822 births
1910 deaths
Republican Party Massachusetts state senators
Republican Party members of the Massachusetts House of Representatives
Mayors of Chicopee, Massachusetts
19th-century American politicians